Airini Elizabeth Woodhouse  (née Rhodes; 8 November 1896 – 13 April 1989) was a New Zealand community leader, historian, and author.

Personal life 
Born Airini Elizabeth Rhodes, in Dunedin, New Zealand, on 8 November 1896, she was an only child. She was at first educated on her parents' remote sheep station by a governess and showed an early aptitude for writing. In 1913 she attended Craighead Diocesan School in Timaru. She grew up on Blue Cliffs, Canterbury, one of her family's other sheep-stations.

She married Randal Woodhouse, then Medical Superintendent of Wellington Hospital, on 22 September 1921 at Upper Otaio and then moved to Wellington. There Randal immediately resigned from his position and by January 1922 he was in Timaru learning farming from the bottom up. They were to have three children, Elizabeth, Carne, and Heaton. Randal Woodhouse died on 1 October 1970 and she moved to her mother's house in Timaru. She died on 13 April 1989.

Career 
Woodhouse joined the Red Cross during World War I and continued to work for them in World War II. She was president of the Blue Cliffs, Canterbury, sub-centre of the Red Cross during both wars, and was awarded a Voluntary Aid Detachment medal for service 1939–1945.

She was elected to the Blue Cliffs parish vestry in 1927, the first year women were admitted, and remained a member until 1961.

In the late 1950s, she and her husband became interested in the Māori rock drawings found in South Canterbury and campaigned for their preservation. She was on the committee of the South Canterbury Historical Society from its inception, and chair of the South Canterbury Centennial History Committee (1954–60). She also chaired the South Canterbury Regional Committee of the New Zealand Historic Places Trust from 1959 to 1975. In 1965 the South Canterbury Regional Committee named a peak in the Hunters Hills range after her, Mount Airini.

In 1969 she became the first woman in New Zealand to be granted registration as an owner-classer by the New Zealand Wool Handling Committee, allowing her to put the Kiwi brand on her bales.

In the 1981 New Year Honours, Woodhouse was awarded the Queen's Service Medal for community service.

Published works 
She is the author of:
 Tales of pioneer women (1988)
 Blue Cliffs: the biography of a South Canterbury sheep station, 1856–1970 (1982) 
 New Zealand Farm and Station Verse 1850–1950 (1967) 
 Blue Cliffs School and District Activities 1910–1960 (1960) 
 Guthrie-Smith of Tutira (1959) 
 George Rhodes of the Levels and his Brothers (1937) 
 The History of the Parish of Otaio and Blue Cliffs (with J. Hay, 1930) 
 Bidwill of Pihautea: the life of Charles Robert Bidwill (1927)

References 

1896 births
1989 deaths
Recipients of the Queen's Service Medal
Writers from Dunedin
People from Timaru
New Zealand farmers
New Zealand women farmers
New Zealand women historians
New Zealand community activists
People educated at Craighead Diocesan School
20th-century New Zealand  historians
Moorhouse–Rhodes family